The Chess World Cup 2015 was a 128-player single-elimination chess tournament held in Baku, Azerbaijan, from 10 September to 5 October 2015.

Sergey Karjakin won the competition on tie-breaks after a four-game final against Peter Svidler. Both finalists qualified for the 2016 Candidates Tournament.

The winner of the Chess World Cup 2013, Vladimir Kramnik, was defeated by Dmitry Andreikin in the third round.

Format
Matches consisted of two games (except for the final, which consisted of four). Players had 90 minutes for the first 40 moves followed by 30 minutes for the rest of the game with an addition of 30 seconds per move from the start of the game. If a match was tied after the regular games, tie breaks were played the next day. The format for the tie breaks was as follows:
 Two rapid games (25 minutes plus 10 seconds increment).
 If the score was tied after two rapid games, two rapid games (10 minutes plus 10 seconds increment).
 If the score was tied after four rapid games, the opponents play two blitz games (five minutes plus three seconds increment).
 If the score was tied after a pair of blitz games, an armageddon game (in which a draw counts as a win for Black) was played. White had 5 minutes and Black had 4 minutes, with an increment of 3 seconds/move starting from move 61.

Prize money

According to the regulations, and contrary to many elite tournaments even including the FIDE Grand Prix, all players had to pay their own expenses for travel.

Participants
The qualified players are seeded by their FIDE ratings of August 2015. Eighteen players qualified by rating. All players are grandmasters unless indicated otherwise.

 , 2816 (R)
 , 2814 (R)
 , 2808 (R)
 , 2793 (R)
 , 2779 (R)
 , 2777 (WC)
 , 2771 (R)
 , 2770 (R)
 , 2765 (R)
 , 2759 (E14)
 , 2753 (R)
 , 2747 (WC)
 , 2741 (R)
 , 2740 (R)
 , 2740 (R)
 , 2739 (R)
 , 2738 (ON)
 , 2736 (R)
 , 2735 (R)
 , 2733 (E14)
 , 2731 (WC)
 , 2726 (J13)
 , 2726 (R)
 , 2725 (Z3.5)
 , 2724 (E14)
 , 2723 (E14)
 , 2720 (WC)
 , 2719 (R)
 , 2714 (R)
 , 2713 (AS14)
 , 2710 (E14)
 , 2710 (E15)
 , 2705 (R)
 , 2705 (E15)
 , 2704 (AS14)
 , 2702 (PN)
 , 2699 (Z3.3)
 , 2699 (E15)
 , 2690 (E14)
 , 2689 (E15)
 , 2680 (Z2.1)
 , 2678 (E15)
 , 2673 (E14)
 , 2673 (E14)
 , 2671 (E14)
 , 2671 (PN)
 , 2670 (Z2.1)
 , 2669 (E14)
 , 2667 (E15)
 , 2665 (E15)
 , 2664 (E15)
 , 2663 (AM14)
 , 2662 (Z3.3)
 , 2662 (Z2.1)
 , 2661 (E14)
 , 2661 (E14)
 , 2660 (PN)
 , 2659 (E14)
 , 2659 (Z2.3)
 , 2659 (E14)
 , 2658 (E14)
 , 2658 (E15)
 , 2655 (AM14)
 , 2655 (E15)
 , 2654 (E14)
 , 2653 (E15)
 , 2651 (ON)
 , 2649 (E15)
 , 2644 (ON)
 , 2644 (AS15)
 , 2643 (AS14)
 , 2643 (AM15)
 , 2642 (E15)
 , 2640 (AF)
 , 2639 (E15)
 , 2637 (E15)
 , 2636 (Z2.4)
 , 2635 (Z3.7)
 , 2635 (Z2.1)
 , 2635 (E14)
 , 2634 (ACP)
 , 2633 (E14)
 , 2632 (AM14)
 , 2631 (AS15)
 , 2631 (E15)
 , 2626 (E14)
 , 2625 (AM15)
 , 2624 (E15)
 , 2624 (PN)
 , 2622 (E15)
 , 2622 (E14)
 , 2621 (ON)
 , 2618 (AS14)
 , 2616 (AM15)
 , 2616 (Z3.5)
 , 2614 (E14)
 , 2607 (J14)
 , 2607 (E15)
 , 2605 (Z2.5)
 , 2603 (E15)
 , 2601 (E14)
 , 2600 (AS15)
 , 2600 (Z3.4)
 , 2595 (E15)
 , 2595 (AS14)
 , 2591 (AF)
 , 2589 (E14)
 , 2577 (AM14)
 , 2570 (AS15)
 , 2568 (Z3.1)
 , 2563 (AM15)
 , 2553 (Z2.1)
 , 2547 (E15)
 , 2528 (WWC)
 , 2514 (Z3.6)
 , 2511 (Z2.5)
 , 2509 (Z3.2)
 , 2495 (Z2.3)
 , 2491 (E15)
 , 2453 (PN)
 , 2436 (Z2.2)
 , 2428 (Z3.4)
 , 2421 (Z2.4)
 , 2416 (AS15)
 , 2357 (Z4.2)
 , 2330 (Z4.1)
 , 2291 (Z4.3)
 , 2241 (Z4.4)

Qualification paths 

WC: Semi-finalists of the Chess World Cup 2013 (4)
WWC: Women's World Champion 2015 (1)
J13 and J14: World Junior Champions 2013 and 2014 (2)
R: Rating (average of all published ratings from February 2014 to January 2015 is used) (19)
E14 and E15: European Individual Championships 2014 (23) and 2015 (23)
AM14 and AM15: American Continental Championships 2014 (4) and 2015 (4)
AS14 and AS15: Asian Chess Championships 2014 (5) and 2015 (5)

AF: African Chess Championship 2015 (2)
Z2.1 (5), Z2.2 (1), Z2.3 (2), Z2.4 (2), Z2.5 (2), Z3.1 (1), Z3.2 (1), Z3.3 (2), Z3.4 (2), Z3.5 (2), Z3.6 (1), Z3.7 (1), Z4.1 (1), Z4.2 (1), Z4.3 (1), Z4.4 (1): Zonal tournaments
 ACP: highest-placed participant of the ACP Tour who has not qualified with the previous criteria (1)
PN: FIDE President nominee (5)
ON: Organizer nominee (4)

Calendar

Results, Rounds 1–4

Section 1

Section 2

Section 3

Section 4

Section 5

Section 6

Section 7

Section 8

Results, rounds 5–7

Final, 1–5 October

References

External links

Pairings tree (PDF). FIDE.
Videostream at Livestream.com

2015
World Cup
World Cup
2015 in Azerbaijani sport
International sports competitions hosted by Azerbaijan
Sports competitions in Baku